Vishnu Vijaya (or Ashaant) is a 1993 bilingual Indian film directed by Keshu Ramsay and released simultaneously in Hindi and Kannada. The film stars Vishnuvardhan, Akshay Kumar, Ashwini Bhave, Ashutosh Rana and Pankaj Dheer.

The Hindi version of the film was a box office failure while the Kannada version became a success. Akshay Kumar, after the death of Vishnuvardhan, said "We did a Hindi and a Kannada version of Ashaant. The Kannada version was a super hit. The Hindi version was a flop. I realised Vishnuji was a much bigger star than I could ever be."

Plot
Ashaant is a story about the effort made by the whole Police Force of the country, especially two police officers, A.C.P. Vishnu, Bangalore Police (Vishnuvardhan) and A.C.P. Vijay Bombay Police (Akshay Kumar), to bring peace, i.e. Shanti to the country. They wage a war against a Mafia who deals in printing fake currency notes and have become a threat to the country's security. These Mafia dons Kaka (Jai Kalgutkar) and Rana (Punit) are operating from Bangalore. But when the pressure of Police Officer Vishnu mounts on them, they decide to shift their base to Bombay. As they enter Bombay, Rana is nabbed by ACP Vijay and is arrested. Vijay starts his investigation to reach the roots of this Mafia through Rana, when orders come from the home ministry to shift Rana from Bombay custody to Bangalore court for many previous serious crimes.

Vijay, along with his friend ACP Amit (Pankaj Dheer), join him to re-arrest Rana. Vishnu, who is in charge of Rana's case gets them permission, on two conditions; that Vijay and Amit can't use their weapons and police uniforms. Vishnu's wife Anita (Ashwini Bhave) and Vijay are ex-lovers. Their relationship ended as Anita's father Ex-Chief Minister Niranjan Das refused to let his daughter marry an ordinary Police Officer. Also, to take revenge on Vijay, he got Vijay's Sister Ritu (Amit's Wife) killed. Vijay then misused his power as Police Officer and forced Niranjas Das to resign as Chief Minister. Anita also took an oath that she would only marry a Police Officer and married Vishnu.

On the other hand, Rana splits away from Kaka and forms his own Mafia, which gradually becomes more powerful and ruthless. Vijay and Amit, along with Vishnu, form a team to capture Rana and now Kaka also. Sonali (Mamta Kulkarni) a dancer in Kaka's hotel, joins this team of three against the two mafia operating in the city.

Kaka manages to create a misunderstanding between Vijay and Vishnu to break their unity and divide their power. Vishnu starts suspecting illegitimate relationships between his wife Anita and Vijay. The degree of suspicion rises, but Amit finally clears the misunderstanding between these Vishnu and Vijay. They join each other with equal faith and then manage to take down both the Mafias. Rana and Kaka are destroyed, but at the cost of sacrificing their dear friend Amit.

Cast
 Vishnuvardhan as Vishnu
 Akshay Kumar as Vijay Roy  
 Ashwini Bhave as Anu / Anita
 Pankaj Dheer as Amit
 Mamta Kulkarni as Sonali
 Sharat Saxena as Chief Minister Niranjan Das
 Puneet Issar as Rana, antagonist

Soundtrack

Trivia
 This is the first South Indian and only Kannada film of famous Bollywood actor Akshay Kumar.

References

External links
 

1993 films
1990s Hindi-language films
1990s Kannada-language films
Films scored by Jatin–Lalit
Indian multilingual films
Indian films about revenge
1993 multilingual films
Films directed by Keshu Ramsay